Sanaadi Appanna is a 1977 Indian Kannada-language musical film directed by Vijay based on the novel Kuniyitu Hejje Naliyithu Gejje by Krishnamoorthy Puranik which was loosely based on the life of Bagalkote shehnai player Appanna (1876-1945). The film starred Rajkumar in title role with Jaya Prada in the lead role along with Ashok, Balakrishna, R. Sampath, Thoogudeepa Srinivas, Papamma and Baby Madhavi in supporting roles. Puneeth Rajkumar made a brief appearance in one of the songs of this film.

The film is considered a landmark in Kannada cinema. It is notable for the fact that Bismillah Khan played the actual shehnai for Rajkumar's character in this movie. The film was remade in Telugu as Sannayi Appanna (1980) starring Sobhan Babu. It saw a theatrical run of 50 weeks.

Cast 

 Rajkumar as Appanna
 Jaya Prada as Basanthi
 Ashok as Appanna's son
 Suma as Hanumanthu/Rao's wife
 Balakrishna
 Sampath, Appanna's uncle
 Thoogudeepa Srinivas as Shivaraya
 Papamma
 Baby Madhavi
 Shivaprakash
 K. Venkataraju
 Bhatti Mahadevappa
 Joker Shyam as Thammayya
 Honnavalli Krishna as Apashruthi Ayyanna's son
 Puneeth Rajkumaras young Hanmanthu

Production 
Sanaadi translates to shehnai in the Kannada language. The films deals with the life of a rural shehnai artiste Appannna (played by Rajkumar). In early 1977, Bismillah Khan flew from Varanasi with his ten-member troupe to Prasad Studios in Madras (now Chennai) and spent nine days working on the film.

Soundtrack

The background score for the film and soundtrack were composed by G. K. Venkatesh. The soundtrack album consists of seven tracks, which includes a Shehnai solo played by Bismillah Khan.

Release, reception and legacy 

The film made its theatrical release in August 1977. It completed a 100-day run in many centers across Karnataka. In the last week of November 1977, during the centenary day celebration at the Urvashi Theatre in Bangalore, Rajkumar paid tribute to Bismillah Khan saying, "I just acted in the role but Ustad Bismillah Khan is the real soul of the film. He gave life to the character I played in the film."

It has been reported that to master the shehnai-wielding technique, Dr. Rajkumar cancelled all his shooting schedules for a month. The elan with which he handles the instrument in the film is commendable. At no point does he ever resort to exaggerated gestures — quite a contrast to Sivaji Ganeshan, who plays the nadaswaram player in Thillana Mohanambal. By the end of it, Khansaheb and Rajkumar had become close friends. When the film completed its 50-week run, Khansaheb came for the celebrations here. "You have handled the shehnai to such perfection that it seemed as if you were really playing it!" the maestro complimented Rajkumar.

Awards 
Karnataka State Film Award for Best Child Actor (Female) (1977) - Baby Madhavi

References

External links 
 

1977 films
1970s Kannada-language films
Films scored by G. K. Venkatesh
Kannada films remade in other languages
Films about classical music and musicians
Films with screenplays by Chi. Udayashankar
1970s musical films
1970s musical drama films
Indian musical films
Indian musical drama films
Films directed by Vijay (director)